Hope Mansell is a village and civil parish in Herefordshire, England. In 2011 the civil parish had a population of 259. Hope Mansell is mentioned in the Domesday Book (1086) as Hope.

References

External links

 Wyenot.com

Villages in Herefordshire